The 2019 Copa Libertadores group stage was played from 5 March to 9 May 2019. A total of 32 teams competed in the group stage to decide the 16 places in the final stages of the 2019 Copa Libertadores.

Draw
The draw for the group stage was held on 17 December 2018, 20:30 PYST (UTC−3), at the CONMEBOL Convention Centre in Luque, Paraguay.

Teams were seeded by their CONMEBOL ranking of the Copa Libertadores as of 15 December 2018 (shown in parentheses), taking into account the following three factors:
Performance in the last 10 years, taking into account Copa Libertadores results in the period 2009–2018
Historical coefficient, taking into account Copa Libertadores results in the period 1960–2008
Local tournament champion, with bonus points awarded to domestic league champions of the last 10 years
For the group stage, the 32 teams were drawn into eight groups (Groups A–H) of four containing a team from each of the four pots. Teams from the same association could not be drawn into the same group, excluding the four winners of the third stage, which were allocated to Pot 4 and whose identity was not known at the time of the draw, and could be drawn into the same group with another team from the same association.

Notes

The following were the four winners of the third stage of qualifying which joined the 28 direct entrants in the group stage.

Format
In the group stage, each group was played on a home-and-away round-robin basis. The teams were ranked according to the following criteria: 1. Points (3 points for a win, 1 point for a draw, and 0 points for a loss); 2. Goal difference; 3. Goals scored; 4. Away goals scored; 5. CONMEBOL ranking (Regulations Article 28).

The winners and runners-up of each group advanced to the round of 16 of the final stages. The third-placed teams of each group entered the Copa Sudamericana second stage.

Schedule
The schedule of each matchday was as follows.

Notes

Groups

Group A

Group B

Group C

Group D

Group E

Group F

Group G

Group H

Notes

References

External links
CONMEBOL Libertadores 2019, CONMEBOL.com

2
March 2019 sports events in South America
April 2019 sports events in South America
May 2019 sports events in South America